Penuel Baptist Chapel, Carmarthen is a Baptist chapel and attached schoolroom in the town of Carmarthen, Carmarthenshire, Wales. The building dates from 1786 and is located in Priory Street at 7, Esplanade, Carmarthen.

Penuel Baptist Chapel was built by Thomas Jones in 1872. It is set back from the road by a stout iron railing fence and has a schoolroom adjoining it which was built in 1886 by George Morgan. The chapel has a broad gabled facade and a large, uncluttered interior in a classical style. It has galleries on all four sides, the downward-pointing timber posts creating quasi-aisles. The corners of the galleries are curved and the fronts of the galleries have panels with balustrades.

In 1909–10, Penuel was fully renovated, to such an extent that only the walls and roof remained from the previous building.

The church was designated as a Grade II listed building on 9 February 1999, being "a chapel of early origins with exceptional early C20 interior, unusual for the 2-storey arcades". At the time of its renovation in 1910 it was stated that the chapel could accommodate 800 people and was designed in such a way that the occupiers of any pew on the ground and gallery floors have a full view of the pulpit and organ.

References

Carmarthen, Penuel
Churches in Carmarthen
Carmarthen, Penuel
Churches completed in 1786